Bridgend College is a further education college based in Bridgend, Wales. Founded in 1928 as the Bridgend Mining and Technical Institute, the college today has four campuses in Bridgend, Pencoed, Queens Road and Maesteg.

The College currently delivers provision for over 6,000 students and employing over 700 members of staff across its four campuses. It was named the Times Educational Supplement FE College of the Year in 2019.

Campuses 
 Bridgend Campus
 Pencoed Campus
 Queens Road Campus 
 Maesteg Campus

Operations 
In 2017, Bridgend College entered into a partnership with Pencoed Comprehensive School to create Penybont Sixth Form College. Through the partnership, 29.3% of students received an A*- A grade while 83.8% secured A*-C results. The grade received for A* – E was 99.4%.

In January 2019 Bridgend College unveiled plans for a new STEAM Academy to be built on the Pencoed Campus, due to open September 2021. The Academy will be a new building to accommodate teaching, learning and support facilities for Science, Technology, Engineering, Arts and Mathematics.

In July 2019 the college cut 34 jobs and closed its loss-making Cardiff Arts Academy due to "financial challenges".

In July 2020 it was announced that Bridgend secondary schools would retain their sixth forms, rather than opening one sixth form centre for the county. Instead, a centre of excellence is being considered at the Pencoed Campus of Bridgend College.

Courses 

Bridgend College offers Diplomas, sub Diplomas, extended Diplomas, Certificates, A levels, Awards, Professional qualifications and NVQs. The college also offers higher education courses, including HNCs, HNDs, Foundation Degrees and Degrees awarded through the University of South Wales, Cardiff Metropolitan University, CMI and Pearson.

Performance

The college has recently been verified as the Best Performing FE College for all qualifications in the whole of Wales. The information comes from a study conducted by the Welsh Government which puts Bridgend College at the top of the league table for all qualifications, with a success rate of 90.4%.

In April 2018, Bridgend College was voted the Best FE College in the WhatUni Student Choice Awards, as well as being proud winners of the RSM Award for Leadership and Governance from the Association of Colleges’ Beacon Award in 2017.

In September 2018, Bridgend College launched a partnered internship programme at the Princess of Wales Hospital in Bridgend, alongside national organisations DFN Project SEARCH, Engage to Change and Elite Supported Employment Agency. Project SEARCH Supported Internship aims to deliver a full-time programme that supports a cohort of learners with additional learning needs (ALN) to get a taste of full-time employment. The programme is based within the premises of a host employer with interns undertaking three work placements across the year.

In 2018, Bridgend College's Queens Road Campus was named Apprenticeship Training Provider of the year for Scotland, Wales and Northern Ireland.

Leadership 
The College is led by its Principal and Chief Executive, Simon Pirotte, and Deputy Principal Viv Buckley. In 2018 Priotte was named Director of the Year - Public/Third Sector at the Institute of Directors' National Director of the Year Awards. Buckley was named Leading Wales' Leadership in the Public Sector award winner in 2018.

Honorary Fellows 

Each year Bridgend College holds its Higher Education awards at Pencoed Campus and honours individuals who have made contributions to education, the community and to the college by awarding an Honorary Fellowship. Honorary Fellows include:

References

External links

 Bridgend College Website

Further education colleges in Bridgend County Borough
Education in Bridgend County Borough
Educational institutions established in 1928
1928 establishments in Wales